Mewburn is a surname. Notable people with the surname include: 

Inger Mewburn (born 1970), Australian academic
Kyle Mewburn (born 1963), New Zealand writer
Robert Mewburn (1827–1891), Australian teacher
Sydney Chilton Mewburn (1863–1956), Canadian lawyer, soldier, and politician